Ndabenkulu Ncube (born August 2, 1988 in Harare) is a Zimbabwean association footballer.

Career
In the summer 2010, he was loaned to Jagiellonia Białystok on a one-year deal from Darryn Textiles Africa United. He made his debut for Jagiellonia as a substitute for Kamil Grosicki on September 10, 2010 in a 2–1 victory over Wisła Kraków.

References

External links 
  
 Ndabenkulu Ncube at footballdatabase.eu

1988 births
Living people
Zimbabwean footballers
Association football midfielders
Podbeskidzie Bielsko-Biała players
Jagiellonia Białystok players
Ekstraklasa players
Expatriate footballers in Poland
Zimbabwean expatriates in Poland